Mary Gormley (born c. 1983) is a model from Claudy, Northern Ireland.

In 2004, Gormley competed in Miss Northern Ireland and placed third. Due to Gormley's dual citizenship (UK & Ireland), she was able to win the Irish national title of "Miss Universe Ireland." She competed as Miss Ireland in Miss Universe 2005, an international beauty competition won by Canada's Natalie Glebova.

Gormley works for the ACA Model Agency in Belfast and has a contract with 1st Option Model Agency in Dublin.

References 

1980s births
Alumni of Ulster University
Irish beauty pageant winners
Female models from Belfast
Living people
Miss Universe 2005 contestants
Year of birth missing (living people)
Beauty pageant contestants from Ireland